is a Japanese artist and designer, known for his unique style combining dieselpunk and Japanese anime elements. He is best known for his conceptual design work on anime series Last Exile and Blue Submarine No. 6.

He began his career in the early 1990s doing design work for video games, including having done the illustrations and character design for the fighting game series made by Atlus, Power Instinct (Goketsuji Ichizoku).

He has published more than a dozen books of his work, some of the most notable being rule and futurhythm. He won the 2006 Seiun Award for "Best Artist of the Year".

Works

Anime
 The Animatrix (The Second Renaissance)
 Blue Submarine No. 6
 Last Exile
 Mardock Scramble (OVA version, canceled)
 SoltyRei (Rose Anderson's bike design only)
 Table and Fisherman
 Shangri-La
 Last Exile -Fam, The Silver Wing-
 ID-0
 BEM
 BEM: Become Human
 Cop Craft

Video games
 The Power Instinct series (Goketsuji Ichizoku in Japan)
 Groove on Fight
 Spy Fiction
 Wachenröder
Taisen Hot Gimmick

Printed works
 Attack on Titan: Harsh Mistress of the City (art)
Cop Craft (art)
Artbooks
Like a Balance Life
futurhythm
Form|Code
robot
futurelog
Doujinshi
Racten
Throw Line

Other works
Murata has been designing figures based on his printed art since at least 2007.  These figures appear to be substantial (although small, that is less than 6×6×6 inches) works of art.  
Figures and sculpture
PSE Pro series figures,  scale
PSE Solid series small figures in sets of six (usually)
Pinky street collaborations
Wall hangings
Silk screen on silk 28×44 inches

References

External links

 PSE Web – Official site of Range Murata
 
 Range Murata July 2005 Interview at J LHLS
 Cosplay Lab interview with Range Murata at Anime Expo 2004

1968 births
Anime character designers
Living people
Manga artists from Osaka Prefecture
Osaka University of Arts alumni